CKB, Ckb or ckb may refer to:
 North Central West Virginia Airport, US, IATA code
 Soranî, Central Kurdish branch language, ISO 639-3 code
 Cracow Klezmer Band, a Polish band
 Crazy Ken Band, a Japanese band
 CKB (gene), a gene that encodes brain-type creatine kinase
 Chung Khiaw Bank, a Singapore bank with branches and subsidiaries in Malaysia and Hong Kong